Kader Hançar (born 12 November 1999) is a Turkish footballer who plays as a striker for the Turkish Women's Football Super League club Fatih Vatan Spor, and the Turkey women's national team.

Club career 

Kader Hançar obtained her license on August 4, 2011. She debuted in the Turkish Women's First League on November 3, 2013, at the age of only 13.

Hançar plays futsal in her high school's team. She was part of the team representing Turkey at the 2014 ISF World Schools Futsal Championship held in Italy that became champion in the girls' category. She was the second-ranked top scorer of the tournament with 15 goals following her teammate Hilal Çetinkaya, who netted 17 goals.

Hançar transferred to the Izmir-based Konak Belediyespor, the rival team of Ataşehir Belediyespor, on August 18, 2017. She debuted at the UEFA Women's Champions League playing in the 2017–18 qualifying round held in Tbilisi, Georgie and scored two of the five goals of her team in the first match against WFC Martve. In the second game, she netted even a hat-trick of her team's five goals against the Slovakian Partizán Bardejov. In the third game of the qualifying round  with Gintra Universitetas from Lithuania, she scored the only goal of Konak Belediyespor, who lost by 1–3 and failed to advance further.

She was transferred by the 2018–19 Women's First League champion Beşiktaş J.K. to play in the 2019–20 UEFA Women's Champions League – Group 9 matches. She scored the only goal of her team in the first game against the Polish Górnik Łęczna. She netted also one goal against the Armenian Alashkert.

In the |2019–20 Women's First League season, she was loaned out from Beşiktaş J.K. to Konak Belediyespor, where she played the first half of the season only. Hançar moved then to Spain to join on 22 January 2020 the Pamplona-based CA Osasuna Femenino, where she plays in the Segunda División Pro.            
Following her team Beşiktaş J.K.'s champions title in the 2020–21 Turkcell League season, she played in two matches of the 2021–22 UEFA Women's Champions League qualifying rounds.

In December 2021, before the beginning of the 2021–22 Women's Super League, she underwent a surgey on her right foot due to a calcaneal bone cyst  with ankle medial malleolus.

For the 2022–23 Super League season, she transferred to Fatih Vatan Spor.

International

After playing in the Turkey girls' national U-15 team's two friendly matches and scoring one goal, she was admitted to the Turkey U-17 team appearing in the friendly match against Greece on March 2, 2014.  After scoring two goals in two games with the Turkey U-17, she was called up to the Turkey U-19 team. On March 18, 2014, she debuted in the Turkey U-19 team still at the age of 14. She played in three games of the 2015 UEFA Women's Under-17 Championship qualification- Elite round, and scored two goals.

Hançar appeared in three matches of the 2017 UEFA Women's Under-19 Championship qualification.

(†): Friendly matches not included

Career statistics
.

Honours
Turkish Women's First League
 Ataşehir Belediyespor
 Runners-up (3): 2013–14, 2014–15, 2015–16
 Third places (1): 2016–17

 Konak Belediyespor
 Third places (1): 2017–18, 2018–19

 Beşiktaş J.K.
 Winners (1): 2020–21

References

External links

Living people
1999 births
People from Kadıköy
Footballers from Istanbul
Turkish women's footballers
Women's association football forwards
Turkey women's international footballers
Turkish expatriate women's footballers
Turkish expatriate sportspeople in Spain
Expatriate women's footballers in Spain
CA Osasuna players
Ataşehir Belediyespor players
Konak Belediyespor players
Beşiktaş J.K. women's football players
Turkish Women's Football Super League players
Turkish women's futsal players
Fatih Vatan Spor players